John Hay High School — also known as the John Hay Campus — is a public high school located in Cleveland, Ohio. John Hay is part of the Cleveland Metropolitan School District, with grade levels including 9th through 12th. The neoclassical school was designed by Cleveland Schools architect George Hopkinson, and was built in 1929. The school is located in Cleveland's centrally located University Circle district, near Case Western Reserve University.

John Hay High School completed renovations in the 2006–2007 school year and is the home of three small schools: the Cleveland Early College High School (2002), the Cleveland School of Science and Medicine (2006), and the Cleveland School of Architecture and Design (2006). The school is named for John Hay, the former U.S. Secretary of State and part-time Cleveland resident.

Clubs and Activities
John Hay HS's Latin Club functions as a local chapter of both the Ohio Junior Classical League (OJCL) and National Junior Classical League (NJCL).
In the Cleveland School of Architecture and Design there is a program called ACE. ACE stands for Architects, Construction, & Engineering and consists of people from around Cleveland who work in those fields coming to John Hay Campus on Tuesdays & Thursdays and mentoring 11th and 12th graders. The students complete projects that have been predetermined for them that relate to all three concepts and present them to the school districts CEO, the Mayor and other family and friends. At the end of a students 12th grade year if they are still in the program and have performed well the will receive a scholarship. John Hay's boys varsity basketball team were the 2010-11 Senate Champions. They were later defeated by Akron's St. Vincent- St. Mary on the road to the State Championship. The school also has an Environmental Club which has its own vegetable garden and recycling program which meets on Tuesdays; and a Poetry Club which meets on Mondays - both of which are on the Early College Floor.

Ohio High School Athletic Association State Championships

 Wrestling - 1938, 1939, 1940, 1941, 1943

Athletics
 Madeline Manning, 800m Olympic Gold Medalist, 1968. 
Ruben Patterson, NBA Forward
Charles Oakley,  Retired NBA Forward - Chicago Bulls, New York Knicks, Toronto Raptors, Washington Wizards, Houston Rockets (Deering Street in front of John Hay renamed "Charles Oakley Way" in his honor)
Tim McGee, Retired NFL Wide Receiver - Cincinnati Bengals
Wesley Carroll, NFL Player, New Orleans Saints, Cincinnati Bengals
John Hicks, Retired NFL Player, College Football Hall of Famer
Anthony Hancock, Retired NFL wide receiver - Kansas City Chiefs

External links

District Website
John Hay High School yearbooks and newsletters available on Cleveland Public Library Digital Gallery, various years 1934 through 2002.

Notes and references

Education in Cleveland
High schools in Cuyahoga County, Ohio
University Circle
Public high schools in Ohio
Cleveland Metropolitan School District
School buildings completed in 1929
1929 establishments in Ohio
Educational institutions established in 1929